The Gotha tramway network is a network of tramways forming part of the public transport system in Gotha, a city in the federal state of Thuringia, Germany.

The network was opened in 1894 with an electrified system implemented by Union-Elektricitäts-Gesellschaft. It is currently operated by Thüringerwaldbahn und Straßenbahn Gotha GmbH (TWSB), and integrated in the Verkehrsverbund Mittelthüringen (VMT).

Lines 

Notes:

 * The headway figure for line 1 takes into account the services on line 4.

Since the timetable change on 13 December 2009, there has been only one pair of line 4 trains each day via Krankenhaus. At other times, travellers to/from Krankenhaus must change to line 1 in Sundhausen.

The old line 3 linked the Huttenstraße with Hauptfriedhof with one intermediate stop, and was shut down on 30 June 1985.  From 1 June 1985 to 1991, a SEV line 3 led from the old Busbahnhof to Hauptfriedhof. Today, this route is operated on Monday to Saturday by city bus line F and the evening line, on Monday to Friday by city bus line E, and on Sundays by city bus line B.

The branch line in Waltershausen formerly belonging to line 4 (between Waltershausen Bahnhof and Waltershausen-Gleisdreieck) has operated since August 2007 as line 6.

See also
List of town tramway systems in Germany
Trams in Germany

References

External links
 
 Track plan of the Gotha tram system
 
 
  Official website

Gotha
Gotha
Transport in Thuringia
Metre gauge railways in Germany
Gotha